Syd'Quan Thompson (born February 7, 1987) is a former American football cornerback. He was drafted by the Denver Broncos as the 225th overall selection in the 2010 NFL Draft. He played college football at California.

Early life
Thompson was born on February 7, 1987. in Sacramento, California, to mother Patrice Thompson. He is also the brother of Carolina Panthers' linebacker Shaq Thompson. He attended Grant Union High School where he played football and earned all-state honors three times. As a junior in 2004, he recorded 950 rushing yards for 18 touchdowns, 15 receptions for 360 yards and four touchdowns, returned five punts, and returned one kickoff for a touchdown. That year, Rivals.com ranked him the number-one junior player in the state, and he received the California Mr. Football Award. As a senior, he recorded more than 70 tackles, two interceptions, 1,000 rushing yards, and 12 touchdowns. He received an invitation to play in the CaliFlorida Bowl. The Sacramento Bee named him to its all-metro second team.

Scout.com rated him the number-five player in its West Hot 100. Rivals.com rated him the 13th-ranked athlete in the nation and the 21st-ranked player in California. ESPN assessed him as the 11th-ranked cornerback in the nation. PrepStar named him an All-American, as did SuperPrep, which also rated him the 17th-ranked defensive back in the nation and the 13th-ranked player in California. Thompson was rated a four-star prospect by both Scout.com and Rivals.com. He received scholarship offers from Arizona, California, Kansas State, Oklahoma, Oregon, UCLA, and Washington.

College career

2005–2007 seasons
Thompson enrolled at the University of California, Berkeley where he majored in social welfare. He sat out the 2005 season as a redshirt. In 2006, starting cornerback Tim Mixon suffered a knee injury before the season, which forced Thompson to fill in that role for the remainder of the season. In the season-opener against Tennessee, Thompson played with a cast because of a broken wrist and was twice outpaced by All-American wide receiver Robert Meachem for touchdown receptions. Tennessee won, 35–18. Thompson started all 13 games of the season, and he recorded 60 tackles including 35 solo, two fumble recoveries including one returned for a touchdown against Stanford, and one interception. The Sporting News named him to its freshman All-Pac-10 team. In 2007, Thompson again started all 13 games and recorded 78 tackles including six for loss, ten broken-up passes, and one interception.

2008 season

In 2008, he started in all 13 games at cornerback and as served as the punt returner. He recorded four interceptions for 128 yards and 18 passes defended. Against Washington State, he set a school single-game record with 108 interception return yards. In that game, he intercepted one pass and returned it 90 yards, before being caught by Washington State running back Christopher Ivory five yards short of the goal line. California scored on its ensuing possession, but Thompson reported he was teased by his teammates and asserted that he "was good for the first 40 yards, but then my back and my hip started tightening up". Against Colorado State, he returned a punt 73 yards for a touchdown, for which he was named the Pac-10 Special Teams Player of the Week. Thompson received the team's Andy Smith Award for most playing time, and he was named to the All-Pac-10 first team.

2009 season
Thompson is on the watch list for the 2009 Lott Trophy, which is an award bestowed upon the nation's best defensive player with strong character. He has also been declared a preseason All-American by many various publications. In preseason predictions for California, many analysts have named California's secondary a major strength, largely because of Thompson. When asked to name his four most important teammates, California linebacker Worrell Williams included Thompson as the only defensive player. He said, "So what's that tell you? He's going to shut down one side of the field when he's out there."

The NFL Draft Scout, a CBS Sports affiliate, rated Thompson 15th of its Top 32 seniors for the 2009 season, and wrote, "His straight-line speed, agility, reliable open-field tackling and natural return skills would be earning significantly more attention from the national media if he played in the Big Ten or SEC." The NFL Draft Scout assessed him as the best cornerback out of the 226 available for the 2010 NFL Draft and projected him as a first or second round selection. Following his senior season, Thompson represented Cal at the 2010 Senior Bowl

Professional career

Denver Broncos
Thompson was drafted in the seventh round of the 2010 NFL Draft by the Broncos as the 225th overall selection. He recorded his first NFL interception against the New York Jets on October 17, 2010. On September 2, 2011, during the Broncos' last preseason game at the Arizona Cardinals, Thompson suffered a ruptured Achilles tendon, and missed the entire 2011 season. Thompson was released from the Denver Broncos roster during the roster cuts before the 2012 regular season.

San Jose SaberCats
Thompson was assigned to the San Jose SaberCats, of the Arena Football League, on November 1, 2013.

Orlando Predators
On February 3, 2014, Thompson was traded, along with Quentin Sims and Andre Freeman, to the Orlando Predators for Simeon Castille.

Los Angeles Kiss
On February 6, 2014, Thompson was traded, along with Matt Spanos, to the Los Angeles Kiss.

Personal life
Thompson's younger brother Shaq was one of the most touted recruits of the class of 2012. He committed to California on March 6, 2011, but a week later, he re-opened his recruitment. On January 7, 2012, he re-committed to California, but re-opened his commitment once again. On January 30, he committed to the University of Washington. He was drafted in the 2015 NFL Draft by the Carolina Panthers.

References

External links

Denver Broncos bio
California Golden Bears bio

1987 births
Living people
American football return specialists
American football cornerbacks
Players of American football from Sacramento, California
California Golden Bears football players
Denver Broncos players
San Jose SaberCats players
Orlando Predators players
Los Angeles Kiss players